Federal elections were held in Switzerland on 28 October 1951. Although the Social Democratic Party received the most votes, the Free Democratic Party remained the largest party in the National Council, winning 51 of the 196 seats.

Results

National Council

By constituency

Council of the States
In several cantons the members of the Council of the States were chosen by the cantonal parliaments.

References

Switzerland
1951 in Switzerland
Federal elections in Switzerland
Federal
October 1951 events in Europe